Ayata is a location in the La Paz Department in western Bolivia. It is the seat of the Ayata Municipality, the second municipal section of the Muñecas Province.

References 

 Instituto Nacional de Estadística de Bolivia

Populated places in La Paz Department (Bolivia)